Midnight Kiss is the title of debut EP by English indie rock/synthpop band Propellers. It was released on 28 January 2013.

Promotion
The first single from the EP was the title track "Midnight Kiss". The song was first played by Jacob Rickard on BBC Introducing in Kent at the beginning of January 2013. The band were chosen for daytime plays on BBC Radio 1 shows, including Sara Cox and Scott Mills. A music video for "Midnight Kiss" was released on 28 January 2013 onto YouTube.

In March 2013, Propellers released the second single from the EP, titled "Landslide". A music video for the track was released onto YouTube on 24 March.

Track listing

Personnel
Propellers
 Max Davenport – lead vocals
 Archie Davenport – guitar
 Charlie Simpson – bass guitar
 Jimmy Goodwin – keyboards
 Will Wilkinson – drums

References

2013 EPs
EPs by British artists